The Prairie Grove Battlefield State Park is an Arkansas state park located in Prairie Grove. It commemorates the Battle of Prairie Grove, fought December 7, 1862, during the American Civil War. The battle secured northwestern Arkansas for the Union.

Description and administrative history
In 1908, the local chapter of the United Daughters of the Confederacy purchased  at the center of the Battle of Prairie Grove. It was maintained by the UDC as a meeting spot and in commemorations of the battle for almost 50 years. A local business owner and politician, J. Sherman Dill, sought funds while serving in the 38th Arkansas General Assembly to improve the park, and was successful in procuring $10,000 ($ in today's dollars). These funds led to the construction of the stone archway at the park entrance, a wooden bandstand, and gravel driveway around 1925. However, the park fell into disrepair during the Great Depression, and was fenced off from use for years.

In 1953, a newly formed Lions Club chapter adopted the park as a club project, raising money through community events and constructing benches, picnic tables, and sidewalks. In 1957, a  stone chimney from nearby Rhea's Mill was carefully moved to the park site. Other historic buildings from the area, including a 1834 log home and blacksmith's shop, were moved to the park site in the following years.

A museum was constructed following a bequest by Biscoe Hindman, the grandson of Major-General Thomas C. Hindman who commanded the 1st Corps, Trans-Mississippi Army, during the battle. Dedicated on May 31, 1964, the museum is named Hindman Hall. The park was added to the state park system in 1971 in a joint effort among Governor Dale Bumpers and state legislators Morriss Henry, Hugh Kincaid, and Charles W. Stewart. The state park grew through land acquisitions and donations in 1980, 1992, and 2005.

The portion of the state park within a  triangle formed by North Road on the northwest and Highway 62 was first listed on the National Register of Historic Places in 1970.

Prominent features of the state park include its battle monument, a chimney carefully relocated here from the site of a skirmish, and the Hindman Museum. The Prairie Grove Airlight Outdoor Telephone Booth, which is listed on the National Register of Historic Places, is  opposite the entrance to the park on Highway 62.

Battle of Prairie Grove reenactment
A Civil War reenactment is held at the state park during the first weekend in December of even-numbered years.

See also
Borden House (Prairie Grove, Arkansas)
List of Arkansas state parks
National Register of Historic Places listings in Washington County, Arkansas

References

External links

 
 Prairie Grove Battlefield at American Battlefield Trust

1957 establishments in Arkansas
American Civil War museums in Arkansas
Arkansas Heritage Trails System
Arkansas in the American Civil War
Battlefields of the Trans-Mississippi Theater of the American Civil War
Conflict sites on the National Register of Historic Places in Arkansas
Museums in Washington County, Arkansas
National Register of Historic Places in Washington County, Arkansas
Parks in Washington County, Arkansas
Prairie Grove, Arkansas
Protected areas established in 1957
State parks of Arkansas
State parks of the U.S. Interior Highlands